Morchella eohespera is a species of fungus in the family Morchellaceae described as new to science in 2016. In North America, it has been collected from Newfoundland and Labrador, New Brunswick, British Columbia, Canada and in Washington state. It is also found in central and northern Europe, and central China. It is in the Morchella elata clade.

References

External links

eohespera
Edible fungi
Fungi described in 2016
Fungi of Canada
Fungi of China
Fungi of Europe
Fungi of the United States
Fungi without expected TNC conservation status